West Chester may refer to some places in the United States:

West Chester, Iowa
West Chester (Des Moines, Iowa), a historic house
West Chester, Tuscarawas County, Ohio
West Chester Township, Ohio
Olde West Chester, Ohio
West Chester, Pennsylvania
West Chester University, Pennsylvania

See also 
West Chester station (disambiguation), stations of the name
Westchester (disambiguation)